Tunstead may refer to:
Tunstead, Derbyshire, England
Tunstead, Greater Manchester, England
Tunstead, Norfolk, England

See also 
Tunstead Milton (in Derbyshire)